Os Olhos da Ásia (Portuguese: The Eyes of Asia) is a 1996 Portuguese historical drama film directed by João Mário Grilo, who also co-wrote the script with Paulo Filipe. It is partially based on the novel Silence by Shūsaku Endō. The film premiered at the Locarno International Film Festival on 15 August 1996 where it was also nominated for the Golden Leopard. The film was released in Portugal on 11 April 1997.

Plot
Nakaura of Julian (Julião Nakaura), a priest of the Society of Jesus, was one of four young ambassadors sent to Rome by the Jesuits in 1538, as proof that Japan had converted to Christianity. Fifty years after the mission, which so fascinated European royalty, Julian was forced again to prove his faith, only this time before a shōgun, who wanted to force him to abandon his religion. Julian resists, as does Miguel Chijiwa, a fellow at the embassy to Rome, who become a martyr. Betrayed by Cristóvão Ferreira, who cannot bear the torture, Julian suffers an inglorious death ... or maybe not.

Cast
Geraldine Chaplin as Jane Powell
João Perry as Cristóvão Ferreira 
António Cordeiro as Mateus
Marques D'Arede as Giovanni Adami
José Eduardo as Lucas do Espírito Santo
Rui Gomes as 	Sebastião
Kyioto Harada as Matazaemon
Edward Ishita as Edward Ishita
Yuzi Kosugi as Kurobei
Carlos Martins Medeiros as António de Souza
Yoshi Oida as Julião Nakaura
Itaru Takahara as Sr. Takahara
Yasukiyo Umeno as Miguel
Diogo Vasconcelos as Orlando

References

External links
 

1990s historical drama films
1996 films
Films about religion
Films based on works by Shūsaku Endō
Films directed by João Mário Grilo
1990s Japanese-language films
Portuguese historical drama films
1990s Portuguese-language films
History of Christianity in Japan
Historiography of Japan
1996 drama films
1997 drama films
1997 films